The 1990 Southwest Independent Soccer League was an American outdoor soccer season run by the Southwest Independent Soccer League during the summer of 1990.  This was the second outdoor and sixth overall season run by the league which would become known as the United Soccer League.

Regular season
 Regulation win = 6 points
 Shootout win (SW) = 4 points
 Shootout loss (SL) = 2 points
 Bonus Points (BP): 1 point for each goal scored up to 3 per game.

Eastern Conference

Western Conference

Playoffs

Quarterfinals
 Colorado Comets defeated Lubbock Lazers 5-1, 5-2
 Richardson Rockets defeated Tulsa Renegades 1-2, 1-0, 3-1
 Austin Sockadillos defeated San Antonio Generals 0-1, 4-1, 3-2
 Tucson Amigos defeated Phoenix Hearts 2-1, 2-1

Semifinals
 Richardson Rockets defeated Austin Sockadillos 2-1, 5-1
 Colorado Comets defeated Tucson Amigos 2-0, 1-0

Final
 Colorado Comets declared champion based on overall record.

Points leaders

Awards
MVP:  Craig Lammering, Colorado Comets
Top Scorer:  Marek Friederich, Lubbock Lazers (32 points)
Leading goal scorer: Chris Veselka, Derek Sholeen, Marcelo Draguicevich (12 goals each)
Leading Assists: Marek Friederich (10)
Top Goalkeeper:  Craig Lammering, Colorado Comets
Coach of the Year:  Phil Jones, Richardson Rockets

External links
United Soccer Leagues (RSSSF)
The Year in American Soccer - 1990

2
USISL outdoor seasons (1989–1994)